The Thrones of Astarte are approximately a dozen ex-voto "cherubim" thrones found in ancient Phoenician temples in Lebanon, in particular in areas around Sidon, Tyre and Umm al-Amad. Many of the thrones have a similar style, with cherubim heads on winged lion bodies on either side. Images of the thrones are found in Phoenician sites around the Mediterranean, including an ivory plaque from Tel Megiddo (Israel), a relief from Hadrumetum (Tunisia) and a scarab from Tharros (Italy).

List of Thrones

Gallery

References

Bibliography
 Sébastien Ronzevalle, Le "Trône d’Astarté", Mélanges de la Faculté Orientale (Beirut) 3 (1909), 755–83, pls 9–10; 
 Sébastien Ronzevalle, ‘Note sur un monument phénicien de la région de Tyr’, CRAI (1907), 589–98
 James R. Davila and Bruce Zuckerman (1993). The Throne of ʿAshtart Inscription. Bulletin of the American Schools of Oriental Research, (289), 67–80. doi:10.2307/1357365
 Józef Milik (1967). Les papyrus araméens d'Hermoupolis et les cultes syro-phéniciens en Égypte perse. Biblica, 48(4), 546–622. Retrieved July 28, 2020, from www.jstor.org/stable/42618436
 Henri Seyrig. Antiquités syriennes. In: Syria. Tome 36 fascicule 1–2, 1959. pp. 38–89; doi : https://doi.org/10.3406/syria.1959.5447 https://www.persee.fr/doc/syria_0039-7946_1959_num_36_1_5447
 Edward Lipiński, Rereading the Inscriptions of the ‘Throne of Astarte’ and the Sidonian Obelisk, Journal of Semitic Studies, Volume 61, Issue 2, Autumn 2016, Pages 319–325, https://doi.org/10.1093/jss/fgw011

External links 

 Lion-Throned Goddesses of West Asia
 Classical Art Research Center: 20. Seated goddess

Phoenician mythology
Near East and Middle East antiquities of the Louvre
Votive offering
1st-millennium BC sculptures
Phoenician sculpture
Collections of the National Museum of Beirut
Thrones
Archaeological artifacts
Cherubim
Astarte
Sculptures of lions